Winnie the Pooh and a Day for Eeyore is a 1983 American animated featurette based on the sixth chapter of both books Winnie-the-Pooh and The House at Pooh Corner by A.A. Milne. Produced by Walt Disney Productions and distributed by Buena Vista Distribution, the short initially received limited release on March 11, 1983, before expanding to a wide release on March 25 as part of a double feature with the 1983 re-issue of The Sword in the Stone (1963), which it accompanied in most countries except Australia where it accompanied a reissue of Bedknobs and Broomsticks (1971). Directed by Rick Reinert, the featurette featured the voices of Hal Smith, John Fiedler, Will Ryan, Ralph Wright, and Paul Winchell.

Additionally, the animation was produced by Rick Reinert Productions, which went uncredited. It would be the first Disney animated film since the 1938 Silly Symphonies short Merbabies to be produced by an outside studio. The company had also previously produced the educational Disney short Winnie the Pooh Discovers the Seasons in 1981.

Winnie the Pooh and a Day for Eeyore was the fourth and final animated featurette in the Winnie the Pooh film series and one of Disney's original theatrical featurettes adapted from the Pooh books by A.A. Milne.

Plot
The film begins with the invention of a racing game called Poohsticks in which Pooh takes a walk to a wooden bridge over a river where he likes to do nothing in particular. On this day, though, he finds a fir cone and picks it up. Pooh thinks up a rhyme to go with the fir cone, but he accidentally trips on a tree root and drops it in the river. Noticing that the flow of the river takes the cone under the bridge, Pooh invents a racing game out of it. As the game uses sticks instead of cones, he calls it "Poohsticks".

Later that day Pooh, Piglet, Rabbit and Roo are playing Poohsticks, then see Eeyore floating in the river. After somehow rescuing him with a rock, he tells them that he fell in due to being bounced from behind. Piglet assumes it was Tigger who bounced Eeyore into the river. When Tigger arrives on the scene, he claims that his bounce was actually a cough, leading to an argument between him and Eeyore, but with some outside help from the narrator, Winnie the Pooh and his friends find out that he had indeed deliberately bounced Eeyore on page 245. Tigger says it was all a joke, but nobody else feels that way. Tigger disgustedly says that they have no sense of humor, and bounces away.

But as Eeyore seems particularly depressed this day, Pooh follows him to his Gloomy Spot and asks what the problem is. Eeyore says that it is his birthday, and nobody has taken any notice to celebrate it. Pooh decides to give him a jar of honey, but does not get far before he has a hunger attack and ends up eating the honey. He decides to ask Owl for advice. Owl suggests that he writes to Eeyore on the pot so that Eeyore could use it to put things in. Owl ends up writing a misspelled greeting (hipy papy bthuthdth thuthda bthuthdy means A Very Happy Birthday, With Love from Pooh) on the pot and flies off to tell Christopher Robin about the birthday. Piglet, who heard about Eeyore's birthday from Pooh, planned to give a red balloon to Eeyore, but when Owl greets him from the sky, Piglet forgets to look where he is going, until he bumps into a tree and the balloon is sent bouncing off course, taking Piglet with it until it stops and the balloon bursts soon after.

Piglet is very sad that his gift for Eeyore is ruined, but he presents it to him anyway, and only a minute later, Pooh brings the empty pot. Eeyore is gladdened, as he puts the busted balloon into the pot and removes it again (he also claimed that red is his favorite color). Pooh and his friends then pitch in and plan a surprise party for their friend.

During the party, Tigger arrives and bounces Rabbit out of his chair, after Owl had a conversation talk. Roo welcomes him to the festivities as Rabbit draws himself up from being bounced on by Tigger, incensed. Rabbit wants Tigger to leave because of the way he treated Eeyore earlier, Roo wants Tigger to stay, and Christopher Robin's solution is for everyone to go to the bridge and play Poohsticks to settle this, which Pooh asked him. Eeyore, a first-time player, wins the most games, but Tigger wins nothing at all, causing him to conclude that "Tiggers don't like Poohsticks". However, Kanga, Roo, Owl and Rabbit decide to go home, because they had to go to bed, but Tigger walks sadly away from the bridge, because he did not win at all. Eeyore shares his secret for winning, which is to "let his stick drop in a twitchy sort of way." They then both go home and Christopher Robin, Pooh and Piglet all decide that "Tigger's all right, really" and "everyone's all right, really".

Voice cast

 Ralph Wright as Eeyore
 Hal Smith as Winnie the Pooh and Owl
 Laurie Main as Mr. Narrator
 Will Ryan as Rabbit
 Dick Billingsley as Roo
 John Fiedler as Piglet
 Kim Christianson as Christopher Robin
 Julie McWhirter Dees as Kanga
 Paul Winchell as Tigger

Only Hal Smith, Ralph Wright, John Fiedler, and Paul Winchell returned in the roles they had originated. Hal Smith additionally replaced Sterling Holloway as Pooh. Kim Christianson became the fourth actor to portray Christopher Robin in as many featurettes, after Bruce Reitherman, Jon Walmsley, and Timothy Turner. Dick Billingsley assumed the role of Roo, succeeding Dori Whitaker and Clint Howard. Julie McWhirter Dees replaced the late Barbara Luddy as Kanga. Some later rereleases of this movie feature a cast list which differs from the original (Jim Cummings as Pooh and Tigger, Ken Sansom as Rabbit, Tress MacNeille as Kanga, Trevyn Savage as Christopher Robin and Aaron Spann as Roo, respectively). However, if there is a version of this movie which features this more contemporary cast, it has yet to be released to the public, as the version featuring these credits uses the same audio track from the original release.

Home media
The first home video release for Winnie the Pooh and a Day for Eeyore was Winnie the Pooh and Friends, released on VHS in 1984, followed by other releases of this film, including the 1989 Walt Disney Mini-Classics release and the 1994 Storybook Classics release. It has since been included as a bonus feature on VHS, DVD and Blu-ray releases of The Many Adventures of Winnie the Pooh, with the Blu-ray edition presenting the short in high definition.

Winnie the Pooh featurettes
 Winnie the Pooh and the Honey Tree (1966)
 Winnie the Pooh and the Blustery Day (1968)
 Winnie the Pooh and Tigger Too (1974)
 Winnie the Pooh and a Day for Eeyore (1983)

References

External links

 

1980s English-language films
1983 short films
1983 comedy films
1980s children's animated films
1980s Disney animated short films
Winnie-the-Pooh featurettes
1983 animated films
Films about donkeys
Winnie the Pooh (franchise)
American animated featurettes
Animated films set in England
Short films with live action and animation
Films about toys